Competence may refer to:

Competence (geology), the resistance of a rock against deformation or plastic flow.
Competence (human resources), Competency is a series of knowledge, abilities, skills, experiences and behaviors, which leads to the effective performance of individual's activities. Competency is measurable and could be developed through training. It is also breakable into the smaller criteria.
Competence (law), the mental capacity of an individual to participate in legal proceedings
Competency evaluation (law)
Jurisdiction, the authority of a legal body to deal with and make pronouncements on legal matters and, by implication, to administer justice within a defined area of responsibility
Subsidiarity (European Union)#EU competences describes the nature and extent of legislative authority in the European Union 
Natural competence (biology), the ability of a cell to take up DNA
Communicative competence, the ability to speak and understand language
Linguistic competence, the ability to speak and understand language

See also
Competence-based management
Core competency
Four stages of competence
Incompetence (disambiguation)
Skill
Legislative Competence Order (Wales)